Atholhurst is a suburb of Johannesburg, South Africa. It is located in Region E.

References

Johannesburg Region E